Knight First Amendment Institute v. Trump, 928 F.3d 226 (2019), is a case at the Second Circuit Court of Appeals on the use of social media as a public forum. The plaintiffs, Philip N. Cohen, Eugene Gu, Holly Figueroa O'Reilly, Nicholas Pappas, Joseph M. Papp, Rebecca Buckwalter-Poza, and Brandon Neely, are a group of Twitter users blocked by U.S. President Donald Trump's personal @realDonaldTrump account. They alleged that Twitter constitutes a public forum, and that a government official blocking access to that forum is a violation of the First Amendment. The lawsuit also named as defendants White House press secretary Sean Spicer and social media director Dan Scavino.

The plaintiffs were represented by the Knight First Amendment Institute at Columbia University, which itself was a plaintiff in the case. Though the Knight Institute's Twitter account had not been blocked by Trump, the lawsuit argued that they and other followers of the @realDonaldTrump Twitter account "are now deprived of their right to read the speech of the dissenters who have been blocked". The complaint also argued that posts to the @realDonaldTrump account are "official statements".

Background
On Twitter, blocked users cannot see or respond to tweets from the account that blocked them. As of July 2017, the @realDonaldTrump Twitter account had 33.7 million followers. Trump's tweets were often retweeted tens of thousands of times, and Trump frequently used Twitter to make policy statements, prior to being suspended from Twitter, losing the 2020 election, and leaving the White House. In June 2017, Spicer stated that Trump's tweets are considered "official statements by the president of the United States". In July 2017, Trump tweeted that his use of social media is "MODERN DAY PRESIDENTIAL". Citizens for Responsibility and Ethics in Washington had filed a similar lawsuit in the District of Columbia, alleging violations of the Presidential Records Act for deleting tweets.

A month prior to filing this lawsuit, the Knight Institute had sent a letter to Trump on behalf of two of the blocked Twitter users, asking that they and other blocked users have their accounts unblocked by Trump. The letter argued that Trump's personal Twitter account is a public forum, and that it is therefore unconstitutional to exclude dissenting views. The letter was copied to Spicer, Scavino, and White House counsel Don McGahn. The Trump administration did not respond to the letter.

Lower court ruling 
Oral arguments were heard before Judge Naomi Reice Buchwald on March 9, 2018. On May 23, 2018, Buchwald granted in part and denied in part the plaintiff's motion for an injunction against Trump's blocking of Twitter accounts, ruling that such actions are unconstitutional on First Amendment grounds. The court ruled that the @realDonaldTrump Twitter account is "a presidential account as opposed to a personal account", and blocking people from it violates their rights to participate in a "designated public forum". Buchwald introduced the decision by writing:

This case requires us to consider whether a public official may, consistent with the First Amendment, “block” a person from his Twitter account in response to the political views that person has expressed, and whether the analysis differs because that public official is the President of the United States. The answer to both questions is no.

After this ruling, the seven Twitter users that were a part of the lawsuit were unblocked by the managers of Trump's account. In August 2018, the government filed an appeal with the United States Court of Appeals for the Second Circuit. Also in August, the Knight First Amendment Institute sent a letter to the U.S. Justice Department requesting that the President comply with the Judge's ruling and unblock a list of 41 additional Twitter users, including Danny Zuker, MoveOn activist Jordan Uhl, health care activist Laura Packard, and journalists like Alex Kotch and Jules Suzdaltsev. Those users were then unblocked by @realDonaldTrump. Regardless, the Trump Administration appealed the ruling to the Second Circuit Court of Appeals, claiming that the district court had subjected him to unconstitutional viewpoint discrimination in violation of his own free speech rights.

Circuit court ruling and subsequent developments 
The Second Circuit issued its decision in July 2019, upholding the district court ruling. The Second Circuit determined that Trump used his Twitter to conduct official government business, and therefore, he cannot block Americans from the account on the basis of their political views. The government was denied an en banc review by the full Second Circuit in March 2020.

On the day of the Second Circuit's decision, former New York state representative Dov Hikind and candidate Joey Salads separately sued U.S. Representative Alexandria Ocasio-Cortez within New York state federal district court for blocking them from her Twitter account, based on the ruling from the Second Circuit. In July 2020, the Knight First Amendment Institute at Columbia University sued Donald Trump again, on behalf of users who were blocked before Trump's inauguration, or who were not able to identify which tweet prompted Trump to block them.

Trump petitioned the Supreme Court in August 2020 to hear his appeal of the Second Circuit ruling. Trump's petition requested the Supreme Court to answer the question "Whether the First Amendment deprives a government official of his right to control his personal Twitter account by blocking third-party accounts if he uses that personal account in part to announce official actions and policies." Following the 2020 election, in which Joe Biden was elected president, Biden became the petitioning party on this (now Biden v. Knight First Amendment Institute) and other pending Supreme Court cases replacing Trump in his role as president. On January 19, 2021, the Justice Department filed a brief asking the Supreme Court to vacate the Second Circuit ruling on the grounds that Trump was soon leaving office and thus the case no longer concerned his account in its official capacity, thus rendering the case moot. The Knight Institute responded by arguing that the Second Circuit ruling should remain, claiming "The case is moot because President Trump's repeated violation of Twitter's terms of service led that company to shut down his account and to ban him permanently from its platform. Because it was President Trump's own voluntary actions that made the case moot, the Supreme Court should leave the appeals court's ruling in place." 

The Supreme Court subsequently vacated the decision and remanded the case to the Second Circuit as to render the case moot on April 5, 2021. Justice Clarence Thomas issued a 12-page concurring opinion, but arguing that Twitter and similar companies could face some First Amendment restrictions even though they are not government agencies.  He suggested that section 230 of the Communications Decency Act had perhaps been construed too broadly, and that Twitter, Facebook, et al, should be regulated as a Common carrier for Telecommunications.

Impact 
In response to critics who question whether Twitter should be considered a public forum, Knight Institute senior attorney Katie Fallow cited a 2017 U.S. Supreme Court decision, Packingham v. North Carolina, in which Justice Anthony Kennedy described social media as "the modern public square" and as one of the most important places for the exchange of views. The ruling, which was unanimous, struck down a North Carolina law that prohibited registered sex offenders from accessing social media sites. The Knight ruling has been cited as an important development in the use of social media as a public forum, and the tendency of government officials to try to block access to that forum or delete past communications.

See also

 Donald Trump on social media
 List of lawsuits involving Donald Trump

References

2019 in United States case law
Donald Trump litigation
Donald Trump and social media
Twitter controversies
United States First Amendment case law
United States District Court for the Southern District of New York cases
United States Court of Appeals for the Second Circuit cases